Amin Abraham Paul Nikfar (born 2 January 1981 in San Jose, United States) is an Iranian-American shot putter. He graduated from the University of California, Berkeley in 2004 where he was a member of the Pi Lambda Phi fraternity.

Amin finished 1st (Gold) in the 2004 Asian Indoor Championships. He finished tenth at the 2005 Asian Championships. He also competed at the 2008 Olympic Games without reaching the final.

His personal best throw is 20.05 metres, achieved in July 2011 in Toronto. This is the current Iranian national record.

Amin is the son of Mohammad Nikfar and Diane Nikfar.

Amin received The Big Pi Award in 2012 from Pi Lambda Phi fraternity. It is awarded to alumni Brothers who are held in high esteem by virtue of outstanding accomplishment which brings honor to the Brother and Pi Lambda Phi. It is the "lifetime achievement award" for Pilam and the Big Pi Chapter has become a "who's who" of well-regarded and famous Pilam alumni.

He competed at the London Olympics, but again failed to reach the final.

Competition record

References

External links

1981 births
Living people
American people of Iranian descent
Iranian male shot putters
Athletes (track and field) at the 2008 Summer Olympics
Athletes (track and field) at the 2012 Summer Olympics
Olympic athletes of Iran
Athletes (track and field) at the 2010 Asian Games
Athletes (track and field) at the 2014 Asian Games
Sportspeople of Iranian descent
Asian Games competitors for Iran
Islamic Solidarity Games competitors for Iran
Islamic Solidarity Games medalists in athletics